The Socialist Party of California (SPCA) was a socialist political party in the U.S. state of California. Founded in the early 1900s, it had been the state chapter of the Socialist Party USA since being re-chartered in 2011. As of July 2020, it was no longer listed as active by the national organization.

Socialist Party of America affiliation

The Socialist Party of California was affiliated with the Socialist Party of America for most of the twentieth century. Author Upton Sinclair was a four time candidate for office, including the United States House of Representatives in 1920, United States Senate in 1922 and Governor of California in 1926 and 1930.

In 1972 the Socialist Party of America changed its name to "Social Democrats, USA" by a vote of 73 to 34 at its December National Convention. Renaming the Party as SDUSA was meant to be "realistic" as the Party had not run a presidential candidate since the 1956 elections.

Socialist Party USA affiliation

The following year, 1973, the Socialist Party USA was formed out the core members of the Debs Caucus. The Socialist Party of California was ultimately reorganized under the Socialist Party USA banner.  The chapter's membership increased during the presidential election of 2008 under the Vice Presidential nominee and 2012 Presidential nominee Stewart Alexander. In June 2011, the Party was re-charted under current State Chair Mimi Soltysik. The Party hosted the October 2011 Socialist Party National Convention, which was held in Los Angeles.  The Socialist Party of California operated with locals in the counties of Los Angeles, Ventura, and the San Francisco Bay Area.

As of July 2020 the SPCA is removed from the SPUSA register of active state parties and the website is inactive.

Notable members
 Stewart Alexander, 2012 nominee for President by Socialist Party USA
 Job Harriman, 1900 vice-presidential candidate of the SPA forerunner Social Democratic Party of America
 Jack London, author and SPA member
 Mila Tupper Maynard, Unitarian minister and SPA member
 Upton Sinclair, multi-time candidate for office
 Mimi Soltysik, 2016 nominee for President by Socialist Party USA
 Thomas W. Williams, State Secretary of the Socialist Party of California

Footnotes

Bibliography
 Shaffer, Ralph E. "A History of the Socialist Party of California", University of California Berkeley, 1955

Political parties established in 1973
California
Political parties in California
California
California
Socialism in California